Datuk Aznil bin Nawawi (born 6 November 1962), better known as Aznil Nawawi (sometimes he credited as Aznil Haji Nawawi, Aznil or Pak Nil), is a Malaysian TV host, singer and actor.

He won the Best Talk Show Award at the Asian Television Awards 2005 in Singapore. In 2011, he marked 30 years of being involved in the local entertainment scene such as Akademi Fantasia.

Background
Aznil was born in Kampung Datuk Keramat, Kuala Lumpur. He graduated from University of Malaya with a Bachelor of Economics degree. He started his career in 1990 as a broadcaster and a media reporter with TV3.
He first started doing news in broadcasting industry, then moved to hosting in 1992. Pop Kuiz was the first program he hosts. In 1994, he hosted Melodi and Teleskop.
He then made the move to Astro Ria television channel, which also marked his entry as creative director for the channel. One of his more popular projects is his involvement with the reality programme, Akademi Fantasia.

In May 2007, Aznil said he wouldn't be back to host the highly-popular programme after hosting it for five consecutive seasons. 
His exclusive contract as a creative consultant with Astro was to expire in September 2007.

Personal life
Aznil has three children, Fildza Haifa whom he calls Fifi, Fariq Haizen whom he nicknames Riki, and a youngest son named Firdaus Hariz called Baby Riz. 

On 27 June 2016, his mother Norbaiti Surur died at the Prince Court medical center at the age of 90 due to old age. Aznil confirms the news via WhatsApp. His mother's remains laid to rest at the Keramat Muslim Cemetery, at 10:45 am.

Honours

Honours of Malaysia
 :
  Companion of the Order of Loyalty to the Crown of Malaysia (JSM) (2012)
  :
  Knight Commander of the Order of the Territorial Crown (PMW) – Datuk (2013)

Programmes hosted 
 1990–1992 – Money Matters (site-reporter)
 1992–1999 – Pop Kuiz (First programme that he hosted), TV3 with Rina Khan
 1994 – Melodi with Fauziah Ahmad Daud
 1995 – Teleskop
 1999 – Kamera Apo? (What Camera?), NTV7
 2000–2001 – Ad-Lib, TV2
 2003–2007 Akademi Fantasia, Astro Ria
 2003–2004 – Melodi, TV3 (for a year before he signed for an exclusive contract with Astro in October 2004)
 2005 – Macam Macam Aznil (His own talk show), Astro Prima, formerly Astro Ria
 2007–2019 – Tom Tom Bak, Astro Ceria
 2008 – Kring-Kring, Astro Ria
 2008 – Jangan Lupa Lirik! (Malaysia version of Don't Forget the Lyrics!), Astro Ria
 2008 – Riuh Pagi, Era FM (daily weekday breakfast show, co-hosted with Din Beramboi until his death)
 2010 – Riuh Pagi, Era FM (daily weekday breakfast show, co-hosted with Ray and Haniff)
 2010 – Serasi Bersama, (Malaysia version of Mr & Mrs), Astro Ria with Sharifah Shahira
 2011 – Akademi Fantasia 9
 2014 – H! Live, Apa Kata Malaysia (Entertainment news on Astro)
 2015 – Seiras Seirama Astro Ria
 2016 – LePaknil 
 2017 – Karok Gram
 2017 – Ring! Ring! Ringgit! 
 2017 – Go Pak Nil
 2017 – AF Megastar
 2019 – Mikrofon Impian 
 2019 – Ketuk-Ketul Ramadan
 2020–2022 – The Masked Singer Malaysia
 2021 – Panggung Memori
 2021–2022 – Hard To Heart 
 2022 – Karaoke Superstar

Ad hoc programmes hosted
 1993 – Anugerah Juara Lagu ke 8 (Song Champion), TV3 with Fauziah Ahmad Daud and Azwan Ali
 1996 – Anugerah Skrin (Screen Award), TV3 with Amy Mastura
 2003 – Anugerah Planet Muzik (Music Planet Award), MediaCorp TV12 Suria and Astro Ria with Sarah Sechan and Najib Ali
 2003 – Anugerah Juara Lagu ke 18 (Song Champion), TV3 with Sarimah Ibrahim
 2005 – Anugerah Seri Angkasa, TV1 with Raja Azura
 2005 – Anugerah Planet Muzik (Music Planet Award), MediaCorp TV12 Suria and Astro Ria with Nirina Zubir
 2006 – Anugerah Planet Muzik (Music Planet Award), MediaCorp TV12 Suria and Astro Ria with Ady Rahman
 2007 – Anugerah Era 07

Filmography

Film

Television series

Telemovie

Discography

Macam-Macam (1996)
First solo album produced by Pony Canyon and released on 31 December 1996, the album consists of 10 songs including a cover song. Jumpa Di Sana is the first single of the album.

Track list
Jumpa Di Sana
Tik Tok
Malam Minggu
Ikrar Anak Malaysia
Baby Riki (a song which specially dedicated for his son, Riki)
Xanoo
Zakia (a 1979 cover song originally performed by Ahmad Albar)
Regulasi
Kaulah Bintang
Dendang Dangdut

Aznil (2008)
Aznil's mini album was published and released officially on 13 August 2008. The mini album that is entitled "Aznil" consists of three songs composed by Edry Abdul Halim and one cover version. Two of the tracks which are Teramat Sangat and Professor Klon were the original soundtrack for the film Duyung and Cicak Man respectively. Both the films were produced by KRU Films which is now KRU Studios.

Track list
Teramat Sangat (soundtrack for Duyung)
Professor Klon (soundtrack for Cicak Man)
Jangan Cepat Marah
Toyol (cover version of the song in 1979 by Sudirman Hj Arshad)

Achievements

2022 
 Special Awards (Anugerah Khas MeleTOP Era 2022)

2015 
 Most Popular Male TV Host (Anugerah Bintang Popular 2014)
 Jan 2015 - Representing Malaysia to International Press Junket organized by NBC Universal Los Angeles for E! Channmel. Get to interview Kim Kardashian, Gulliana Rancic, Ryan Seacrest, Christina Milan among others
 Feb 2015 - Representing HBO Asia to The Academy Awards in Los Angeles

2013 
 Most Popular Male TV Host (Anugerah Bintang Popular 2011)

2011 
 Most Popular Male TV Host (Anugerah Bintang Popular 2010)
 Most Inspirational Host (TV3 Mykids Award

2010 
 Best Game Show (Asian Television Awards 2010, Singapore) – Jangan Lupa Lirik!
 Most Popular Male TV Host (Anugerah Bintang Popular 2009)

2009 
 Most Popular Male TV Host (Anugerah Bintang Popular 2008)
 Companion of the Gracious Order of Territorial Crown of Malaysia (JMW)

2008 
 Best Entertainment Presenter (Anugerah Juri 2008)
 Most Popular Male TV Host (Anugerah Bintang Popular 2007)

2007 
 Best Talk Show (Anugerah Skrin 2007) – Macam Macam Aznil
 Most Popular Male TV Host (Anugerah Bintang Popular 2006)

2006 
 Most Popular Male TV Host (Anugerah Bintang Popular 2005)

2005 
 Most Popular Male TV Host (Anugerah Bintang Popular 2004)
 Best Talk Show (Asian Television Award 2005, Singapore) – Macam Macam Aznil
 Best TV Host (Anugerah Sri Angkasa 2005)

2004 
 Best Family Show (Anugerah Sri Angkasa 2004) – Macam Macam Aznil
 Most Popular Male TV Host (Anugerah Bintang Popular 2003)
 Special Award (Media Hiburan 2004)
 Best TV Host (Anugerah Sri Angkasa 2004)

2003 
 Most Popular Male TV Host (Anugerah Bintang Popular 2003)

See also 
 Astro Ria
 Akademi Fantasia
 Cicak Man

References

External links 
 
 Aznil's Profile

1962 births
Living people
People from Kuala Lumpur
Malaysian people of Malay descent
Malaysian male voice actors
Malaysian television personalities
Malaysian Muslims
Malaysian people of Minangkabau descent
University of Malaya alumni
Companions of the Order of Loyalty to the Crown of Malaysia
Malaysian infotainers
Akademi Fantasia